The Dales may refer to:

Places
Yorkshire Dales, an area in England with a national park
The Dales (Christmas Island), an area in Christmas Island
Dalarna or The Dales, a province in Sweden

Media
Mrs Dale's Diary, later The Dales, a British radio programme 
The Dales (TV programme), a 2013 British documentary travel show
Dalelands, a fictional area in the Forgotten Realms setting of Dungeons & Dragons

See also
 Dale (disambiguation)
 Dalles (disambiguation)
 The Dalles, Oregon